Pseudopedobacter beijingensis is a Gram-negative and motile bacterium from the genus of Pseudopedobacter.

References

Sphingobacteriia
Bacteria described in 2014